The 2019 Stockton-on-Tees Borough Council election took place on 2 May 2019 to elect members of the Stockton-on-Tees Borough Council in England. It was held on the same day as other local elections.

Results summary

Ward results

Billingham Central

Billingham East

 
 
 

 

No UKIP candidate as previous (-22.0).

Billingham North

Billingham South

 
 
 

 

No BIA candidate as previous (-9.5).

Billingham West

Bishopsgarth & Elm Tree

Eaglescliffe

 
 
 

 

No UKIP candidate as previous (-13.3).

Fairfield

Grangefield

Hardwick & Salters Lane

Hartburn

Ingleby Barwick East

Ingleby Barwick West

Mandale & Victoria

Newtown

Northern Parishes

Norton North

Norton South

Norton West

Parkfield & Oxbridge

Roseworth

Stainsby Hill

Stockton Town Centre

Village

Western Parishes

Yarm

References

2019 English local elections
May 2019 events in the United Kingdom
2019
2010s in North Yorkshire